Korean nationalist historiography is the way of writing Korean history.

See also 

Historiography
Korean nationalist historiography

Further reading 
 Yŏng-ho Ch'oe, « An outline history of Korean historiography », Korean Studies, vol. 4, 1980, p. 1-27
 , Grace Koh et James B. Lewis, « The Tradition of Historical Writing in Korea », in Sarah Foot, Chase F. Robinson, The Oxford History of Historical Writing : Volume 2: 400–1400, Oxford University Press, 2015, 672 p., p. 119-137
 Don Baker, « Writing History in Pre-Modern Korea », in José Rabasa, Masayuki Sato, Edoardo Tortarolo, Daniel Woolf, The Oxford History of Historical Writing : Volume 3: 1400–1800, Oxford University Press, 2015, 752 p., p. 103-118
 Henry Em, « Historians and Historical Writing in Modern Korea », in Axel Schneider, Daniel Woolf, The Oxford History of Historical Writing : Volume 5: Historical Writing Since 1945, Oxford University Press, 2015, 752 p., p. 659-677.

External links